Grabower Süsswaren is a German food company based in Grabow. It was founded in 1835 by Johann Bollhagen. Since 1996, it has been managed by Otto and Monika Lithardt.

Grabower produces a range of biscuits and cakes. The company exports products to roughly 50 countries and offers private-label production services. As of June 2010 they have joined the Continental Bakeries group.

Lithard expanded the company through further acquisitions to form the Grabower confectionery group. Pastries, marshmallows, marshmallows and crispbread were produced at the Grabow, Arnstadt, Prichsenstadt, Kühren-Burkartshain and Herten locations.

In 2010, Grabower Süsswaren GmbH was taken over by Continental Bakeries along with several other Lithard acquisitions.

References

External links
Official website 

Bakeries of Germany
Companies based in Mecklenburg-Western Pomerania
Food and drink companies established in 1835
German companies established in 1835
Ludwigslust-Parchim